Veit Herrmanns (born 25 May 1946) is a German water polo player. He competed in the men's tournament at the 1968 Summer Olympics.

References

External links
 

1946 births
Living people
German male water polo players
Olympic water polo players of East Germany
Water polo players at the 1968 Summer Olympics
People from Stendal
Sportspeople from Saxony-Anhalt